The Hardest Town (2009) is the fifth studio album by American hard rock band Rhino Bucket. It is their second album to feature Simon Wright (formerly of AC/DC) as drummer. The band played over 100 shows in support of the album in 31 states and 15 countries.

Track listing

 The Hardest Town  (4:01) 
 Justified   (4:27) 
 Know My Name  (3:44) 
 Dog Don't Bite   (5:37) 
 No One Here   (3:40) 
 Street To Street   (3:51) 
 Take Me Down   (3:23) 
 She's With Me   (4:10) 
 You're Gone   (3:02) 
 To Be Mine   (5:20) 
 Slip Away (Bonus Track)   (3:36) 
 Vision Thing (Bonus Track For Preorders)   (3:32)

Personnel
 Georg Dolivo: lead vocals, rhythm guitar
 Brian "Damage" Forsythe: lead guitar, backing vocals
 Reeve Downes: bass guitar, backing vocals
 Simon Wright: drums

References

2009 albums
Rhino Bucket albums